Mangqu is a town in Guinan County, Qinghai, China. The seat of Guinan County is located in Mangqu. Mangqu has an altitude of about 3200 m. Mangqu has a population of about 7000. Some original residents in the Longyangxia area were relocated in Mangqu because of the construction of Longyangxia Dam.

References 

Hainan Tibetan Autonomous Prefecture
Township-level divisions of Qinghai